The nForce 500 is a motherboard chipset series and the successor to the nForce4 series. It was revealed by NVIDIA on 2006-03-07 and released on May 23, 2006. The nForce 500 series supports AMD's Socket AM2 and support for Intel's LGA 775 has also been added.

Specifications
Support for NVIDIA SLI technology, including Quad SLI (enabling the simultaneous use of four GPUs) and SLI LinkBoost developments.
Support for up to six SATA 3Gbit/s hard disks and ten USB 2.0 devices.
Support for dual RAID 5.

Chipsets for AMD processors

nForce 590 SLI MCP
Enthusiast dual GPU segment, with full 16+16 SLI support.
Uses the C51XE northbridge and MCP55XE southbridge. The two chips provide a total of 46 PCI Express lanes.

nForce 570 SLI
Performance dual GPU segment.
Total of 28 PCI Express lanes.

nForce 570 LT SLI
Performance dual GPU segment.
Total of 20 PCI Express lanes.

nForce 570 Ultra 
Performance single GPU segment, lacking SLI support.
Total of 20 PCI Express lanes.

nForce 560 SLI
Performance dual GPU segment, featuring only one Ethernet and four SATA ports.
Total of 20 PCI Express lanes.

nForce 560
Mainstream single GPU segment, lacking SLI support, and featuring only one Ethernet and four SATA ports.
Total of 19 PCI Express lanes.

nForce 550
Mainstream single GPU segment, lacking SLI and RAID 5 support, and featuring only one Ethernet and four SATA ports.
Total of 20 PCI Express lanes.

nForce 520
Value/Mainstream single GPU segment, lacking SLI and RAID 5 support, and featuring only one 10/100 Ethernet and four SATA ports.
Total of 20 PCI Express lanes.
Uses MCP65S northbridge.

nForce 520 LE
Value single GPU segment, lacking SLI, RAID 0+1 and RAID 5 support, and featuring only one 10/100 Ethernet, 8USB ports two SATA ports.
Total of 20 PCI Express lanes.

nForce 500 SLI (nForce4 SLI AM2)
Performance dual GPU segment.
Total of 20 PCI Express lanes.

nForce 500 Ultra (nForce4 Ultra AM2)
Performance single GPU segment.
Total of 20 PCI Express lanes.

nForce 500 (nForce4 AM2)
Value single GPU segment.
Total of 20 PCI Express lanes.

Chipsets for Intel processors

nForce 590 SLI
Enthusiast dual GPU segment, with full x16 + x16 SLI support.
Total of 48 PCI Express lanes.

nForce 570 SLI
Performance dual GPU segment, with x8 + x8 SLI support.
Total of 20 PCI Express lanes.

See also
 Comparison of Nvidia chipsets

References 

https://www.nvidia.com/page/mobo.html

External links 
Official Site - All NVIDIA nForce AMD/Intel
Official site - NVIDIA nForce 500 Series for AMD
Official site - NVIDIA nForce 500 Series for Intel
NVIDIA Official Press Release
AnandTech - nForce 500: nForce4 on Steroids?
AnandTech - nForce 590 SLI Intel Edition: NVIDIA prepares an Intel 975X Killer
HardwareZone - NVIDIA nForce 500 Chipset Family
iXBT Digit Life - NVIDIA nForce 500 Chipsets
Mike's Hardware - Roadmap Q2 2006
Sudhian - NVIDIA nForce 590 SLI Review
The Tech Report - NVIDIA's nForce 590 SLI

Nvidia chipsets